Arina Nikishova (born March 16, 1997, in Moscow, Russia) is a Russian Group rhythmic and aesthetic group gymnast. She is the 2015 Summer Universiade Group All-around gold medalist and the 2017 European champion in aesthetic group gymnastics.

References

External links 
 
 

1997 births
Living people
Russian rhythmic gymnasts
Gymnasts from Moscow
Universiade medalists in gymnastics
Universiade gold medalists for Russia
Universiade bronze medalists for Russia
Medalists at the 2015 Summer Universiade
21st-century Russian women